Ocshapalca (possibly from Quechua uqsha high altitude grass, pallqa bifurcation, division into two parts) is a mountain in the Cordillera Blanca in the Andes of Peru, about 5,888 m (19,318 ft) high. It is situated in the Ancash Region, Huaraz Province, on the border of the districts Independencia District and Tarica. Ocshapalca lies between the mountain Hatunkunka in the west and Ranrapalca in the east.

References

Mountains of Peru
Mountains of Ancash Region